The family name Begbie (orig. Baikbie, 1566. Baigbie, 1594) originates in south-east Scotland, where it is most common in the Edinburgh and East Lothian areas.

Begbie is derived from the Old Norse personal name and byname Baggi + Old Norse býr; 'settlement' or 'farm'. Whilst also appearing in Old Danish, Baggi was used to describe a 'bag', 'pack', 'bundle' or 'ram' (male sheep) in Old Norse. During the Middle Ages, Baggi was also used as a byname for a 'Norwegian, man from Norway.' The earliest documented usage is recorded in Norway during the 14th century (in Bohuslän, now Sweden).

In its  contemporary form, Bagge appears both as a given and family name in Denmark and the southern regions of Sweden and Norway. (Derivative forms of the name can also be found in Scandinavia. For example, the Danish patronymic form Baggesen, and equivalent Norwegian form Baggesson, meaning "Son of Bagge"). 'Bagge Baggesen', a 51 year old male, is noted in the Danish national census of 1850 as residing in Ålborg.

(The same place name elements can be found in Baggeby, Stockholm county, Sweden, and also Bagby, North Yorkshire, England). The lands of Begbie (orig. Bagby) were gifted to the nunnery at Haddington by its founder, Queen Ada, wife of Henry, King of Scots, and mother to Malcolm IV and William I, upon her death in 1178. Begbie is one of a number of settlements in East Lothian whose place name elements are Scandinavian in origin. Others include Humbie and Blegbie.

Notable people and characters with the surname include:

Alfred William Begbie, British civil servant in India
Denis Begbie (1914–2009), South African cricketer
Harold Begbie (1871–1929), English author and journalist
Isaac Begbie (born 1868), Scottish footballer
James Begbie (1798–1869), British medical doctor
James Warburton Begbie (1826–1876), British medical doctor
Jeremy Begbie, Thomas A. Langford Research Professor at Duke Divinity School, Duke University
Herbert Gordon Smirnoff Begbie (born 1905), former bishop of Parramatta
Matthew Baillie Begbie (1819–1894), British-born judge who served in British Columbia
Jack Mouland Begbie (Violinist), founding member and Leader of the BBC Scottish Orchestra
Francis Begbie, the main antagonist in Trainspotting, its prequel Skagboys and sequels Porno and The Blade Artist, as well as the 1996 film adaptation of Trainspotting and its 2017 sequel
William Begbie mudered in 1806 and robbed of over £4000

See also
Sir Matthew Begbie Elementary School, public elementary school in Vancouver, British Columbia
Mount Begbie, a named peak near Revelstoke, British Columbia